Washland or washes are areas of land adjacent to rivers which are deliberately flooded at times when the rivers are high, to avoid flooding in residential or important agricultural areas.  They often provide for overwintering wildfowl, and several include important nature reserves.

Examples of washlands include:
 The Ouse Washes of Cambridgeshire and Norfolk
 The Nene Washes of Cambridgeshire

References

Landforms
Flood control